In enzymology, a ribosylnicotinamide kinase is an enzyme that catalyzes the chemical reaction

ATP + N-ribosylnicotinamide  ADP + nicotinamide ribonucleotide

Thus, the two substrates of this enzyme are ATP and N-ribosylnicotinamide, whereas its two products are ADP and nicotinamide ribonucleotide.

This enzyme belongs to the family of transferases, specifically those transferring phosphorus-containing groups (phosphotransferases) with an alcohol group as acceptor.  The systematic name of this enzyme class is ATP:N-ribosylnicotinamide 5'-phosphotransferase. This enzyme is also called ribosylnicotinamide kinase (phosphorylating).  This enzyme participates in nicotinate and nicotinamide metabolism.

Health
Studies show potential for obesity treatment and for longer healthier life. Ribosylnicotinamide kinase seems to activate similar genes that Resveratrol does.

Food
The enzyme can be found in milk and beer. Since the molecules are difficult to detect, it is expected that there are a lot more food products containing ribosylnicotinamide kinase.

References

 

EC 2.7.1
Enzymes of unknown structure